D'Estienne d'Orves may refer to:

 Several members of the Estienne Family, among whom:
 Thomas d'Estienne d'Orves (1727–1782), Navy officer
 Henri Honoré d'Estienne d'Orves (1901–1941), Navy officer and hero of the French Resistance
 Nicolas d'Estienne d'Orves (born 1974), a French journalist

 D'Estienne d'Orves-class aviso, a warship class named in honour of Henri Honoré d'Estienne d'Orves 

French-language surnames